The Saddam interview refers to a famous television interview that occurred between President of Iraq Saddam Hussein and American news anchor Dan Rather on February 24, 2003, very shortly before the 2003 Invasion of Iraq. The interview was aired both in the United States and on all three Iraqi television networks. British politician Tony Benn had also interviewed Saddam earlier that month.

Background

Rather and CBS Evening News executive producer Jim Murphy were driven around Baghdad for 45 minutes and switched cars on two separate occasions to keep Saddam's position secret. The interview was held at the Republican Palace. Neither Rather nor Murphy were allowed to bring their own tape recorders. Saddam supplied his own translator, and CBS approved the translation of the recording. Rather and Murphy were treated well in the course of the interview, with Saddam offering Rather coffee at one point.

American interview

In the 1980s, Rather had an on-air confrontation with then-president George H. W. Bush over the Iran-Contra Affair. His son, George W. Bush, responded similarly, and declined to give Rather an interview during his presidency. After the Saddam interview, the White House was interested in a rebuttal interview. CBS News would accept President Bush, Vice President Dick Cheney or Secretary of State Colin Powell for the interview, but the White House only offered other officials for the interview, such as Ari Fleischer and Dan Bartlett. The CBS network deemed these individuals inappropriate for the broadcast, and an American interview was never done.

Highlights
Memorable lines:

Saddam: ...Bear with me. My answers are long.
Rather: Mr. President, I have all night.

Saddam invited President Bush to a live TV debate, to which Bush declined.

Rather: Who would moderate this debate?
Saddam: Yes, you Mr. Rather.
Rather: With respect, Mr. President, I have other problems. I've got enough problems already.

On one occasion Saddam interrupted his translator and corrected his use of the term "Bush", instead of "Mr. Bush", which Saddam explained was out of respect.

Saddam Hussein floated an idea of holding a live uncensored unprepared debate televised worldwide where both American and Iraqi Presidents sitting in their respective countries would discuss their nation's problems. He also said Dan Rather could moderate the debate. This never happened.

Summary

Saddam declares his support of Allah, Islam and Palestine.
Saddam denies possessing weapons of mass destruction, or the possession of arms against U.N. Law.
Saddam denies association with Osama bin Laden.
Saddam declares he will not step down from presidency or ever surrender against a stronger opponent.
Saddam also declares he will not go into asylum, or leave Iraq.
Saddam claims that his armed forces lost only 10% of their military equipment in 1991's Operation Desert Storm.
Saddam expressed willingness to participate in a live globally televised Presidential debate before the Invasion in 2003.

Notes

 Saddam Hussein Interview Airs In Iraq CBS News. February 27, 2003.

External links
Transcript: Saddam Hussein Interview CBS News. February 26, 2003.
.
Transcript of interview between Tony Benn and Saddam Hussein
Other interviews with Saddam Hussein

CBS News
Saddam Hussein
Interviews
Saddam
Saddam
February 2003 events in Iraq